Pairwise error probability is the error probability that for a transmitted signal its corresponding but distorted version will be received. This type of probability is called ″pair-wise error probability″ because the probability exists with a pair of signal vectors in a signal constellation. It's mainly used in communication systems.

Expansion of the definition
In general, the received signal is a distorted version of the transmitted signal. Thus, we introduce the symbol error probability, which is the probability  that the demodulator will make a wrong estimation  of the transmitted symbol  based on the received symbol, which is defined as follows:

where  is the size of signal constellation.

The pairwise error probability  is defined as the probability that, when  is transmitted,  is received.

Using the upper bound to the probability of a union of events, it can be written:

Finally:

Closed form computation
For the simple case of the additive white Gaussian noise (AWGN) channel:

The PEP can be computed in closed form as follows:

 is a Gaussian random variable with mean 0 and variance .

For a zero mean, variance   Gaussian random variable:

Hence,

See also
 Signal Processing
 Telecommunication
 Electrical engineering
 Random variable

References

Further reading
 
 

Signal processing
Probability theory